Sultan Sharafuddin Idris Shah Al-Haj Ibni Almarhum Sultan Salahuddin Abdul Aziz Shah Al-Haj (born 24 December 1945) is the ninth and current Sultan of the Malaysian state of Selangor. He ascended the throne on 22 November 2001, succeeding his father, Sultan Salahuddin Abdul Aziz Shah.

Early life and education
Sharafuddin was born on 24 December 1945, at Istana Jema'ah, Klang, as the first son of the Raja Muda (Crown Prince) of Selangor, Tengku Abdul Aziz Shah and his first wife, Raja Saidatul Ihsan binti Tengku Badar Shah (born. 1923–2011). He was named Tengku Idris Shah at birth. His father was the eldest son of Hisamuddin of Selangor and Raja Jemaah, who later became the second Yang di-Pertuan Agong and Raja Permaisuri Agong of Malaysia. His mother was the grandchild of both Sulaiman of Selangor and Abdul Jalil of Perak. As such, his parents were first cousins.

He received his primary education at Malay Primary School, Kuala Lumpur when he was nine. He then attended St. John's Institution from 1954 until 1959.

In 1960, his father became the Sultan of Selangor, taking the regnal name Sultan Salahuddin Abdul Aziz Shah. In the same year, Sharafuddin was proclaimed the Raja Muda of Selangor at age fifteen. He was sent abroad to continue his education, attending the Hale School in Perth, Western Australia, from 1960 and later Langhurst College in Surrey, United Kingdom, from 1964.

After returning from the United Kingdom in 1968, Sharafuddin joined the government as a public servant, and was attached to the Selangor State Secretariat under the administration of Menteri Besar Harun Idris. He served in the Kuala Lumpur District Office and Kuala Lumpur police department.

In 1970, he was formally installed and took oath as the 8th Raja Muda of Selangor in a ceremony held at Istana Alam Shah, Klang.

On 24 April 1999, he was appointed as Regent of Selangor after his father became the eleventh Yang di-Pertuan Agong.

Sultan of Selangor
On 22 November 2001, he was proclaimed Sultan of Selangor, succeeding his father, who died after only two years as Yang di-Pertuan Agong. He took the regnal name Sharafuddin (connoting 'religious enlightenment' in Arabic), and is styled as Sultan Sharafuddin Idris Shah.

Coronation
His formal coronation took place on 8 March 2003 at Istana Alam Shah, Klang.

The event started with inspection of Royal Guard of Honour made up of 103 members of the Royal Malaysian Navy by Sharafuddin. He entered the Balairung Seri (throne room) accompanied by a procession of palace officers. He carried out a few rituals including kissing the Quran and kissing the royal regalia, Keris Terapang Gabus before being crowned by the Selangor Mufti.

The ceremony was attended by royal family members of Selangor, royal family members of monarchies of Malaysia and federal government officers. Those who are in attendance include Tengku Amir Shah, Tengku Mustafa Kamel Sultan Mahmud of Terengganu, Tunku Naqiyuddin Tunku Jaafar of Negeri Sembilan, Nazrin Shah of Perak, Muhammad V of Kelantan, Tunku Abdul Malik of Kedah, Ibrahim Ismail of Johor and Abdullah of Pahang. Also in attendance are acting Prime Minister Abdullah Ahmad Badawi, who represented the Yang di-Pertuan Agong, Sirajuddin of Perlis, Regent of Perlis Tuanku Syed Faizuddin Putra Jamalullail, and Pengiran Muda Mahkota Pengiran Muda Brunei Haji Al Muhtadee Billah ibni Sultan Hassanal Bolkiah.

Role
As Sultan, he is known to have revoked state awards conferred by him or by his father. In 2007, he revoked the Datuk title of a businessman who pleaded guilty for financial fraud. He has also suspended others who have been charged in court for various misdealings or faced bankruptcy. In 2011, he suspended the datukship of former transport minister Chan Kong Choy in relation to the latter being charged in court over the Port Klang Free Zone scandal.

The 2008 general election saw sweeping political change in Selangor. For the first time, Barisan Nasional (BN) did not win control of the state assembly. Sharafuddin presided over the swearing-in of the first non-BN Menteri Besar of Selangor.

In May 2009, he underwent a ten-hour open heart surgery at Stanford University Medical Center in Palo Alto, California.

In early 2011, he became embroiled in a crisis over the appointment of the state secretary, the state's highest-ranking civil servant. The federal government appointed Mohd Khusrin Munawi to the position, which was consented to by Sharafuddin. However, the Pakatan Rakyat-led state government opposed the appointment. The state government eventually relented, and Khusrin assumed his duties in February 2011.

He was the Pro-chancellor of MARA University of Technology (UiTM) from the year 2000 until 2005, and is the current chancellor of Universiti Putra Malaysia since 2002.

Marriages and children
Sharafuddin married thrice.

In 1968, as Tengku Idris, he married Raja Zarina binti Raja Tan Sri Zainal. The marriage ended in divorce in 1986. Sharafuddin and Raja Zarina have two children:
Tengku Zerafina (born 1969), currently an entrepreneur based in London. She married Colin Salem Parbury on 5 December 2004.
Tengku Zatashah (born 1973), currently the CEO of Light Cibles Malaysia, and an environmental activist. She married Aubry Rahim Mennesson (born 1972), a French, at the Grand Mosque of Paris, France on 10 November 2007. A wedding reception was held on 28 February 2008 at Istana Alam Shah, Klang.

In 1988, Tengku Idris married American-born Nur Lisa Idris binti Abdullah (née Lisa Davis). They divorced in 1997 and have one child:
Tengku Amir Shah (born 1990), the current Raja Muda of Selangor.

In August 2016, as Sultan, he married television personality Norashikin Abdul Rahman, now known as Tengku Permaisuri Norashikin. The solemnisation ceremony was performed by Selangor Mufti Datuk Mohd Tamyes Abd Wahid at Masjid Istana Diraja in Istana Alam Shah, Klang and were witnessed by Selangor deputy mufti Dr Anhar Opir, Imam Mohd Rasid Mahful, former deputy mufti of Selangor Datuk Abdul Majid Omar and Selangor Islamic Religious Council member Datuk Salehuddin Saidin.

Interests
Sharafuddin is known for being adventurous, having circumnavigated the world and scaled a mountain. At 30, he climbed Mount Kinabalu.

Prior to becoming Sultan, Sharafuddin was an avid sailor. In 1995, he circumnavigated his yacht, SY Jugra, around the world. The journey took 22 months. He sold the yacht before becoming Sultan. The Raja Muda Selangor International Regatta, a major annual sailing event, is named after him.

He has also taken part in rallies and long distance car races. He joined and completed the 1997 Peking to Paris Motor Challenge in his 1932 Ford Model B. He covered 16,000 km in 43 days, winning the silver medal in the vintage car category. In 1986, he drove a Proton Saga from Kota Kinabalu to Kuching, covering 1,111 km in two days.

Titles, styles and honours

Sharafuddin's full style and title is: Duli Yang Maha Mulia Sultan Sharafuddin Idris Shah Alhaj ibni Almarhum Sultan Salahuddin Abdul Aziz Shah Alhaj, Sultan dan Yang di-Pertuan Selangor Darul Ehsan Serta Segala Daerah Takluknya.

Or in English: His Royal Highness Sultan Sharafuddin Idris Shah Al-Haj ibni Almarhum Sultan Salahuddin Abdul Aziz Shah Al-Haj, The Sultan and Sovereign Ruler of Selangor Abode of Sincerity and its Sovereign Dependencies

Military ranks 

 1974: Honorary Major, Rejimen Askar Wataniah
 1998: Honorary Commander, Royal Malaysian Navy Volunteer Reserve
 2001: "Captain-in Chief", Captain, Royal Malaysian Navy
 17 April 2002 : "Captain-in Chief", Rear Admiral, Royal Malaysian Navy

Honours

In March 2001, he received an honorary degree from Universiti Teknologi MARA.

He is an Honorary Life President of the Football Association of Selangor.

He has been awarded :

Honours of Selangor 
  Grand Master (since 21 November 2001) and First Class (DK I, 14 March 1970) of the Royal Family Order of Selangor
  Grand Master (since 21 November 2001) and Knight Grand Commander (SPMS, 6 June 1961) of the Order of the Crown of Selangor
  Founding Grand Master and Knight Grand Companion of the Order of Sultan Sharafuddin Idris Shah (SSIS, since 14 December 2002)
  Grand Master of the Order of Sultan Salahuddin Abdul Aziz Shah (SSSA, since 21 November 2001)
  Sultan Sharafuddin Coronation Medal (8 March 2003)
  Sultan Salahuddin Coronation Medal  (28 June 1961)
  Sultan Salahuddin Silver Jubilee Medal (3 September 1985)

Honours of Malaysia 
  : 
  Recipient of the Order of the Crown of the Realm (DMN, 19 February 2003)
  Recipient of the Installation of Sultan Salahuddin Abdul Aziz Shah as XI Agong of Malaysia Coronation Medal (26 April 1999)
  : 
  First Class of the Royal Family Order of Johor (DK I)
  Knight Grand Commander of the Order of the Crown of Johor (SPMJ) - Dato' (1975)
  : 
  Member of the Royal Family Order of Kedah (DK) (2003)
  : 
  Recipient of the Royal Family Order or Star of Yunus (DK) (2002)
  : 
  Member of the Royal Family Order of Negeri Sembilan (DKNS) (19 July 2002)
  : 
  Member 1st class of the Family Order of the Crown of Indra of Pahang (DK I) (8 April 2021)
  : 
  Recipient of the Royal Family Order of Perak (DK, 2002)
  : 
  Recipient of the Perlis Family Order of the Gallant Prince Syed Putra Jamalullail (DK, 11 December 2005)
  : 
  Member first class of the Family Order of Terengganu (DK I, 2003)

Foreign honours 
  : 
  Commander of the National Order of the Legion of Honour (Cdr L.H. 2012)
  : 
  Sultan of Brunei Golden Jubilee Medal (5 October 2017)

Ancestry

References

External links
 Official biography

1945 births
Living people
Sharafuddin
People educated at Hale School
Sharafuddin
Sharafuddin
Malaysian Muslims

Sharafuddin
First Classes of the Royal Family Order of Johor

Knights Grand Commander of the Order of the Crown of Johor
Members of the Royal Family Order of Kedah
First Classes of the Family Order of Terengganu

Commandeurs of the Légion d'honneur
Recipients of the Order of the Crown of the Realm
First Classes of the Family Order of the Crown of Indra of Pahang
Knights Grand Commander of the Order of the Crown of Selangor